Eaman is both a given name and surname. Notable people with the name include:

Eaman al-Gobory, Iraqi physician
Keith Eaman (born 1947), Canadian football player

See also
Eamonn